The Liga Nacional de Baloncesto Profesional (LNBP) Most Valuable Player Award is an annual award given to the most valuable player in the Mexican highest professional basketball league. The award is given after the regular season.

Winners

Awards won by nationality

Awards won by club

Notes

References

Basketball most valuable player awards
MVP